Jèkafo is a small town and commune in the Cercle of Dioila in the Koulikoro Region of southern Mali. As of 1998 the commune had a population of 5,138.

Radio Jèkafo operates in the area.

References

External links
Jekafo at csa-mali.org

Communes of Koulikoro Region